Anton Palvadre (25 March 1886 – 16 January 1942) was an Estonian lawyer and politician.

Life
Palvadre was born in Korijärve, Kreis Dorpat (now Valga Parish). In 1908 he was imprisoned by the tsarist authorities for reasons of revolutionary activity in Tartu and Riga. In 1911 Palvadre graduated from the Law Faculty of the University of Tartu and then worked as a lawyer. During World War I he served as a Russian officer on the front line and was in a German prison for three years.

In 1919 he became one of the leading heads of the Estonian Socialist Workers' Party.

He was an editor of the Sotsiaaldemokrat, an Estonian socialist newspaper.

The Soviet authorities arrested Palvadre on June 14, 1941, and he was deported to Russia. He was sent to a Soviet Union prison. He died in January 1942 in a "reform and labor camp" in the Sverdlovsk Oblast.

Personal life
Palvadre had five brothers. Rein Palvadre, Jaan Palvadre, Peeter Palvadre, Jakob Palvadre, Juhan Palvadre. Palvadre was married to Gerta Palvadre. The couple had two daughters, Lea and Aime. Palvadre's wife and children were deported in 1941. They lived for 15 years in the Kirov Oblast.

References

1886 births
1942 deaths
People from Valga Parish
People from Kreis Dorpat
Eastern Orthodox Christians from Estonia
Estonian Social Democratic Workers' Party politicians
Estonian Socialist Workers' Party politicians
Members of the Riigikogu, 1920–1923
Members of the Riigikogu, 1923–1926
Members of the Riigikogu, 1926–1929
Members of the Estonian National Assembly
20th-century Estonian lawyers
University of Tartu alumni
Russian military personnel of World War I
Recipients of the Order of the White Star, 1st Class
Estonian people who died in Soviet detention
People who died in the Gulag